Jean-Claude André Adolphe Hamel (9 July 1929 – 2 June 2020) was the President of AJ Auxerre from 1963 to 2009, when he was replaced by Alain Dujon.

Honours
Orders
Chevalier of the Légion d'honneur: 2002

References

1929 births
2020 deaths
AJ Auxerre
Association football executives
Chevaliers of the Légion d'honneur